Drimys confertifolia is a species of flowering plant in family Winteraceae. It is native to Juan Fernández Islands off the western coast of South America.

Description
Drimys confertifolia is an evergreen tree or large shrub, growing up to 15 meters tall. It flowers from November to January. It is hermaphroditic and wind-pollinated.

Range and habitat
Drimys confertifolia is endemic to the Juan Fernández Islands. It is the dominant tree in lowland dry forest and lower montane forest on Robinson Crusoe Island (Masatierra) and Alejandro Selkirk Island (Masafuera).

Drimys confertifolia is common on Robinson Crusoe Island, where it is a forest tree growing with Myrceugenia fernandeziana (Myrtaceae), Zanthoxylum mayu (Rutaceae), and Juania australis (Arecaceae).

On Alejandro Selkirk Island it is found in small patches or as scattered trees rather than in large pure stands. It grows with the ferns Blechnum cycadifolium (Blechnaceae), Dicksonia externa (Dicksoniaceae), Histiopteris incisa (Dennstaedtiaceae), and Lophosoria quadripinnata (Dicksoniaceae).

References

confertifolia
Endemic flora of the Juan Fernández Islands